Carmen Alexander Mlodzinski (born February 19, 1999) is an American professional baseball pitcher in the Pittsburgh Pirates organization.

Amateur career
Mlodzinski attended and graduated from Hilton Head Island High School in Hilton Head Island, South Carolina. In 2017, his senior season, he was named the South Carolina 4A Player of the Year. After informing professional scouts that he would be honoring his college commitment to the University of South Carolina, he went undrafted in the 2017 Major League Baseball draft and thus enrolled at USC to play college baseball for the South Carolina Gamecocks.

In 2018, Mlodinzski's freshman year at USC, he pitched  innings, going 3–6 with a 5.52 ERA and 21 walks and 43 strikeouts over 19 games (seven starts). As a sophomore in 2019, he was the Gamecocks' opening day starter. However, during his third start of the year, he suffered a foot injury and missed the remainder of the 2019 season. That summer, he returned from the injury, playing for the Falmouth Commodores of the Cape Cod Baseball League and pitching to a 1.83 ERA and 43 strikeouts as opposed to five walks over  innings. Mlodzinski entered his redshirt sophomore season in 2020 as a top prospect for the 2020 Major League Baseball draft. He pitched to a 2.84 ERA over four starts before the college baseball season was cut short due to the COVID-19 pandemic.

Professional career
Mlodzinski was selected by the Pittsburgh Pirates with the 31st overall pick of the draft. He signed with the Pirates on July 2, 2020, for a $2.05 million bonus. He did not play a minor league game in 2020 due to the cancellation of the minor league season caused by the pandemic.

Mlodzinski made his professional debut in 2021 with the Greensboro Grasshoppers of the High-A East. He was placed on the injured list on July 12 with a shoulder injury, and was activated on August 14. He returned to the injured list once again on September 9, but was activated only one week later. Over 14 starts with Greensboro, Mlodzinski went 2-3 with a 3.93 ERA and 64 strikeouts over  innings. Following the end of Greensboro's season, he was promoted to the Indianapolis Indians of the Triple-A East, with whom he pitched two innings. He was selected to play in the Arizona Fall League for the Peoria Javelinas after the season. He was assigned to the Altoona Curve of the Double-A Eastern League for the 2022 season. In early May, he was placed on the injured list due to a shoulder injury but was activated a week later. Over 27 games (22 starts), he went 6-8 with a 4.78 ERA and 111 strikeouts over  innings.

References

External links

South Carolina Gamecocks bio

1999 births
Living people
People from Hilton Head, South Carolina
Baseball players from South Carolina
Baseball pitchers
South Carolina Gamecocks baseball players
Falmouth Commodores players
Greensboro Grasshoppers players
Indianapolis Indians players
Peoria Javelinas players
Altoona Curve players